Latifrons is a genus of spiders in the family Thomisidae. It was first described in 1911 by Władysław Kulczyński. , it contains only one species, Latifrons picta, of New Guinea.

References

Thomisidae
Monotypic Araneomorphae genera
Spiders of Oceania